The 2022–23 Biathlon World Cup – Stage 2 was the second event of the season and was held in Hochfilzen, Austria, from 8 to 11 December 2022.

Schedule of events 
The events took place at the following times.

Medal winners

Men

Women

References 

Biathlon World Cup - Stage 2, 2022-23
2022–23 Biathlon World Cup
Biathlon competitions in Austria
Biathlon World Cup - Stage 2